Decision mathematics  may refer to:

Discrete mathematics
Decision theory, identifying the values, uncertainties and other issues relevant in a decision